Wutong Mountain (Hong Kong Hakka: Ng2tung2san1) is a mountain located near the border of Luohu and Yantian in Shenzhen, China. At 943.7m, it is the tallest mountain in Shenzhen. The mountain is also source of the Shenzhen River.

Wutong Mountain is a state-level urban scenic area with landscape features such as the integration of mountains, sea and lake, the integration of landscape and city, the overview of Shenzhen and Hong Kong, and the main functions of ecological and scenic resource protection, science popularization and scientific research, leisure, and sightseeing.

The main attraction of Wutong Mountain is the two main peaks of Big Wutong and Little Wutong. The Big Wutong is the highest peak in Shenzhen.

Etymology 
The name of Wutong comes from the earliest Chinese poetry book, Classic of Poetry. Wutong tree is the Chinese parasol tree. The poem describes the growth of the Wutong tree, which makes the phoenix cry. Phoenix flew from the South China Sea to the North, only in the Wutong tree to fall, visible the nobleness of the plant. The legend of "Phoenix dwelling on Wutong Tree" is widely spread among the people. Therefore, the Wutong tree is endowed with spirituality and expresses people's good wishes for Wutong Mountain.

As for other possible etymologies of Wutong Mountain, according to Shenzhen Evening News, there are three possible speculations. The first speculation about the source of the name is based on the observation that the hills of Wutong Mountain undulate. Overlooking Mount Wutong, she was like a centipede, snaking for dozens of miles. That's why it was originally called "Centipede Mountain". Since the pronunciation of centipede in Mandarin is similar to Wutong, its name slowly evolved into Wutong Mountain. A second speculation is that the name is due to the fact that Wutong Mountain is dotted with thistle, which is a type of plant that pronounced the same as "Wutong" in mandarin. A third speculation about the etymology is that Wutong Mountain is named for its rich "strange grass of Chinese parasol tree", which refers to spiritual plants such as the Chinese parasol tree, plants of the orchid family and other plants with high ornamental and medicinal value.

Geography

Topography 

There are three main peaks, namely Small Wutong, Bean Curd Head and Big Wutong, which are called "Three Towering Peaks" in history. The majestic mountain reflects the vast Mirs Bay and matches the cloud which changes irregularly. It connes Hong Kong with streams and mountains. Known far and wide, Wutong Mountain has a long history. "Wuling Heavenly Pound" had been praised as one of eight sceneries in Xin'an County in history. Now, "Wutong Clouds" has been listed as one of eight new sceneries of Shenzhen for its capricious and magic scenery.

Natural resources 
Praised as "Lung of the city" vividly, vast vegetation of Wutong Mountain from the significant ecological barrier of Shenzhen. The forest coverage rate of Wutong Mountain reaches 88.6%. The types of vegetation in the mountain are multiple. South subtropics seasonal rainforest, mountainous orderly broad-leaf forest, hilltop dwarf forest, hilltop shrubs and glasses are distributed orderly from the foot to the top of the mountain. At present, such ecological sceneries as "Ten miles flowers of Rhododentron" and "Camellia flowers sea of Wutong" etc, which constructing according to the natural conditions of Wutong Mountain display striking "flower sea" sceneries.

Wutong Mountain is a rare natural scenic spot in China, which is located in urban area, with coastal mountains and natural vegetations as its main scenery. There are eight scenery blocks such as "Musical Instrument in Phoenix Valley", "Wutong Clouds", "A Phoenix Perching on the Green Wutong", "East Lake Park" and "Fairy Lake Botanical Garden" etc. In 1993 it was awarded the title of National Park of Guangdong by the Guangdong Provincial Government. In December 2009, it was conferred the title of National Park of China by the State Council.

Fauna and flora 
Wutong Mountain with plentiful animals and plants resources is an important species gene bank of Shenzhen. Wutong Mountain is home to 1,376 species of rescular plants, 537 species of insects, 196 species of different animals in the national park, of which there are 36 species of plants such as Aquilaria sinensis, Amentotaxus argotaenia, Alsophila spinulosa etc. and over 20 species of animals such as Python molurus, Manis pentadactyla, virerricula indica etc. which were approved as national and key protected animals and plants.

Cultural References 

 The unique Hakka cultural atmosphere creates the unique strong Hakka cultural atmosphere of Wutong Mountain, which contains the charm of Hakka culture.
 In 111 BC (the sixth year of Yuan Ding), Emperor Wu set up nine counties, which belong to Boluo County of Nanhai County. From the Western Han Dynasty, Three Kingdoms to the Western Jin Dynasty, Wutong Mountain belonged to Boluo County, Nanhai County. Years after, it belonged to Xin 'an County. At that time, this mountain was called Wutong Mountain.
 Ge Hong, the famous Taoist grand master of the Eastern Jin Dynasty, practiced medicine and practiced in Mount Luofu, traveled to various famous mountains in Guangdong, and once visited Wutong Mountain.
 According to the records in Wutong Mountain Collection, Lü Dongbin, was fond of Wutong landscape, and he wrote more than 100 poems. In the early Ming Dynasty, the Wudang patriarch Zhang Sanfeng opened the Wutong Mountain to build many temples, and left more than poems.
 Wutong Mountain is very famous for its Taoist culture since ancient time. Wutong Mountain famous Taoist temple has "Shang Qing Palace, Taoyuanxian Cave, Jinxia Cave, Eight Highness Hall, Jinxia Cave, Zangxia Cave", worship "Northern Emperor, Jade Emperor, Wenchang Emperor, Guanyin Dashe, Guan Emperor, Sanqing patriarch, etc."
 In 2004, Wutong Mountain was selected as one of the eight scenic spots in Shenzhen.

Trails 
There are multiple choices of trails to climb to the top of Wutong Mountain.

Wutong Mountain Rd. North 
Since no vehicles up the hill and cycling are allowed, from archway to Haohanpo Square is the easiest and has the highest safety factor.

Entrance: Northwest gate of Wutong Mountain

Route: Wutong Mountain North gate archway -- Wutong Mountain Rd. North -- Fenghuang Terrace -- Small Wutong Square

Total distance: about 7.8 km

Time (One-way): 2.5-3.5 hours

Taishan Stream 
Taishan Stream Trail is the Wutong Mountain scenic spot construction of the earliest, the most popular, and the most classic hiking trail. It is a good choice for summer hiking, but relatively harder to hike.

Entrance: Northwest gate of Wutong Mountain

Route: Wutong Mountain North gate archway - Taishan stream - Hulu pool - Big Wutong peak

Total distance: about 5.5 km

Time (One-way): 3-4 hours

Bitong Rd. 
The Bitong Road was officially completed in September 2007. It is the longest, most complete and most physically challenging hiking trail in Wutong Mountain Scenic Spot.

Entrance: Yantian District People's Hospital

Route: Yantian District Hospital (Seventh People's Hospital of Shenzhen) -- Bitong Rd. -- Conjunction with Xiutong Rd -- Big Wutong Peak

Total distance: about 6.7 km

Time (One-way): 3-4 hours

Festival Activities

Wutong Mountain Hiking Festival 
On October 2, 2003, the first Wutong Mountain Hiking Festival was held in Shenzhen. Thousands of people participated in the festival. Since then, in order to encourage national sports and develop tourism in Wutong Mountain Scenic spot, one day in early October every year has been set as the Wutong Mountain Hiking Festival.

Floral displays ===  
Before the pandemic, it was of great significance for Yantian District of Shenzhen to further promote the construction of ecological civilization and speed up the construction of modern, international and advanced coastal city in order to build a world famous flower city. Through the measures of ecological road environment, humanization of leisure facilities, landscape of important nodes, and so on, Yantian District has made great efforts to create a number of flower themed boutique landscapes with outstanding landscape highlights and flower landscape avenue showing the characteristics of Yantian.

Gallery

See also
Qiniangshan
List of parks in Shenzhen

References

Luohu District
Wutong
Geography of Shenzhen